This list of film acting awards is an index to articles that describe awards given to actors and actresses in films. It includes general awards, best cast awards, and awards for debut actresses and actors. It excludes awards for lead actress, lead actor and supporting actor (male and female), which are covered by separate lists.

General

Best Cast

Debut actress

Male debut actors

See also

 Lists of awards
 Lists of acting awards
 List of film awards
 List of film awards for lead actress
 List of film awards for lead actor 
 List of awards for supporting actor

References

 
 
 
 
film acting
film